Eugene Neil McCarthy (26th July 1932 – 5th February 1985) was an English actor known for his dramatic physical appearance caused by acromegaly. He was also a talented linguist and pianist.

Early life 
Born in Lincoln, Lincolnshire, the son of Sleaford dentist Eugene Charles McCarthy (1899–1954) and Beatrice Annie (née Corney, 1901–1978), McCarthy was educated at Stamford School (where his contemporaries included cricketer M. J. K. Smith and author Colin Dexter) before reading modern languages at Trinity College Dublin, and trained as a Latin and French teacher.  He could also speak fluent Greek.

Career 
After his teacher training, McCarthy appeared in repertory theatre in Oxford, at the Edinburgh Festival Fringe and in the West End.

McCarthy's film credits include memorable roles as Welsh soldier Private Thomas in Zulu (1964), as Sergeant Jock McPherson in Where Eagles Dare (1967), as Gates in The Ruffians (1973), as the villain Calibos in Clash of the Titans (1981) and as a robber in Time Bandits (1981). His television credits include: Barnaby Rudge, Man of the World, Danger Man, The Avengers, The Saint, Z-Cars, Dixon of Dock Green, Great Expectations, Randall and Hopkirk (Deceased), Catweazle, My Wife Next Door (A Sense of Movement), Softly, Softly: Taskforce, Department S, Who Pays the Ferryman?, Return of the Saint, Doctor Who (in the serials The Mind of Evil and The Power of Kroll), Enemy at the Door, Shogun, The Professionals, Some Mothers Do 'Ave 'Em, Only When I Laugh, The Gentle Touch and Emmerdale Farm, and the television adaptation of the Lord Peter Wimsey novel, The Nine Tailors.

He died of motor neurone disease in Fordingbridge, Hampshire in 1985, aged 52.

Selected filmography 
 Breakout (1959) – Chandler's henchman (uncredited)
 Sands of the Desert (1960) – Hassan
 Barnaby Rudge (1960) – Hugh (TV mini-series)
 The Criminal (1960) – O'Hara
 Offbeat (1961) – Leo Farrell
 Solo for Sparrow (1962) – Dusty
 The Pot Carriers (1962) – Bracket
 We Joined the Navy (1962) – Sergeant
 Two Left Feet (1963) – Ted (uncredited)
 The Cracksman (1963) – Van Gogh
 Zulu (1964) – Private Thomas
 The Hill (1965) – Burton
 Cuckoo Patrol (1967) – Superman No.2
 Great Expectations (1967) – Joe Gargery (TV mini-series)
 Seven Times Seven (1968) – Mr. Docherty
 Where Eagles Dare (1968) – Sgt. Jock MacPherson
 Follow Me! (1972) – Parkinson
 The Zoo Robbery (1973) – Skipper
 Steptoe and Son Ride Again (1973) – Lennie
 Some Mothers Do 'Ave 'Em (1973) - Take A Break, Take A Husband, aka "The Hotel" (S1 E4) - Mr Bedford (Hotel Manager)
 Operation Daybreak (1975) – Man at Quarry (uncredited)
 Side by Side (1975) – Alf (uncredited)
 Fern, the Red Deer (1976) – Poacher
 Trial by Combat (1976) – Ben Willoughby
 The Incredible Sarah (1976) – Sergeant
 Measure for Measure (1979) – Abhorson
 Shōgun (1980, TV series) – Spillbergen
 George and Mildred (1980) – Eddie
 The Monster Club (1980) – Watson – B-Squad Member
 The Professionals (1980, TV series) – Sam Armitage
 Clash of the Titans (1981) – Calibos
 Time Bandits (1981) – 2nd Robber
 Nancy Astor (1982, TV series) – Reverend Neve

References

External links 

1932 births
1985 deaths
20th-century English male actors
Neurological disease deaths in England
Deaths from motor neuron disease
English male film actors
English male stage actors
English male television actors
People from Lincoln, England
Male actors from Lincolnshire
People with acromegaly
People educated at Stamford School
Alumni of Trinity College Dublin